"Mysterious" is a song by English rapper Jentina. It was released as the third and final single from her eponymous debut album Jentina (2005). It was released only in Italy. Plans were made for a UK release but were cancelled.

A music video, directed by Ben Ib was made for this single with a futuristic theme. The video was mostly computerised with Jentina singing in many different locations and appearing in many different magazines.

Track listing
"Mysterious"
"Mysterious" (The Vanden Plas Remix)
"Mysterious" (James Ford Remix)
"Mysterious" (Return to the Stone Age Mix)

Chart performance

References

2005 singles
Jentina songs
Songs written by Matt Rowe (songwriter)
2005 songs
Virgin Records singles